The Communist Party of Latvia (LKP) was a political party in Latvia.

History

Latvian Social-Democracy prior to 1919
The party was founded at a congress in June 1904. Initially the party was known as the Latvian Social Democratic Workers' Party (LSDSP). During its second party congress in 1905 it adopted the programme of the Russian Social Democratic Labour Party (RSDLP) as its own. At the Fourth Congress of the RSDLP in 1906, the LSDSP entered the RSDLP as a territorial organisation, and after the congress its name was changed to Social-Democracy of the Latvian Territory.

The party held its fourth congress in Brussels from 26 January to 8 February 1914.

In May 1918 Latvian Social Democratic Workers' Party was founded by the Menshevik elements who had been expelled from the LSD.

Rule in Soviet Latvia, 1919–1920

The party briefly governed the Latvian Socialist Soviet Republic in 1919; and changed its name to the Communist Party of Latvia in March 1919; 7,500 members in 1919. The youth wing of the party was the Young Communist League of Latvia (LKJS).

The LKP was a member of the Comintern (Third International) from 1919.

Underground and exile, 1920–1940
In the aftermath of the Latvian War of Independence, the LKP was banned in Latvia. Its leadership resided in exile in the USSR, while the organisation in Latvia operated clandestinely, either through underground cells, or via proxy organisations, such as "Red" leftist trades unions.

In 1928 the party started operating more openly, and contested the 1928 Saeima elections through a proxy list known as the "Left Trade Unions". The list won five seats, but was banned in 1930. They reformed the following year to contest the next elections as the "Trade Union Workers and Peasants Group", winning six seats. However, in 1933 the Supreme Court ordered the dissolution of the party, and its MPs were arrested and charged with treason.

In 1936, a youth organization parallel to the LKJS, Workers' Youth League of Latvia (LDJS), was formed as a cooperative effort by the LKP and their former rivals, the erstwhile Menshevik Latvian Social Democratic Workers' Party, outlawed following the Ulmanis coup d'état in 1934.

In power in the Latvian SSR, 1940–1990

After the Soviet occupation of Latvia in June 1940 and the ousting of the Ulmanis government, the LKP and LDJS were legalised again and could operate openly. It was the only party de facto allowed to contest in the Soviet staged 1940 elections, which it did under the aegis of the  "Latvian Working People's Bloc" installed by the Communists hemselves. The party later merged into the Communist Party of the Soviet Union (Bolsheviks). As the Latvian branch of CPSU(b) it was renamed as Communist Party of Latvia (Bolshevik) ((LK(b)P). When the CPSU(b) was renamed the Communist Party of the Soviet Union in 1952, the Latvian branch was reconstituted under the old name LKP.

Article 6 of the Latvian SSR Constitution (1978) made the LKP's monopoly on political power in Soviet Latvia explicit. In 1990, the Supreme Council of the Republic of Latvia (formerly the Latvian SSR Supreme Soviet, now dominated by the Latvian Popular Front) voted to remove Article 6 from the Constitution.

On 14 April 1990, a pro-independence faction under Ivars Ķezbers split off from the LKP to form the Independent Communist Party of Latvia. The main body of the LKP, under the chairmanship of Alfrēds Rubiks, remained loyal to Moscow and the CPSU leadership. Later that same year, on 14 September, Ķezbers's party was officially renamed the Democratic Labour Party of Latvia (LDDP) and adopted nominally social-democratic platform.

Post-independence, 1990–1993
Following Latvia's renewed independence from the Soviet Union, the LKP was banned by a decision of the Supreme Council of the Republic of Latvia on 10 September 1991 as an organisation deemed hostile to Latvia's independence. In October of that year, the official newspaper of the Communist Party of Latvia Cīņa, was shut down and banned. Later, an organization by the name of the League of Communists of Latvia was created by Albert Lebedev. However, registration to this organization was denied. In 1993, it was indicated that the League of Communists of Latvia became affiliated to the Union of Communist Parties – Communist Party of the Soviet Union. Since then the party has operated underground and under "certain conditions"

In 1994, the Socialist Party of Latvia was founded as the successor to the LKP.

Press
Cīņa (Struggle) was a newspaper founded in March 1904 as the Central Organ of the Latvian Social-Democrats. It was published periodically in Riga, Brussels and Petrograd. From 1919 it was the organ of the Communist Party of Latvia.

While the LKP leadership was in exile in the USSR during the interwar years and the Nazi occupation in World War II, Cīņa was published in the Russian SFSR. From 1940 onwards it was published in Riga.

In the Latvian SSR, Cīņa was one of the main Latvian-language dailies. In 1990, when the Ķezbers faction split from the main LKP to form the Independent Communists, they changed the name of the newspaper to Neatkarīgā Cīņa (The Independent Struggle), which after privatisation in the 1990s later became Neatkarīgā Rīta Avīze.

The Russian-language sister publication to Cīņa published by the LKP was the daily Sovetskaya Latviya (Soviet Latvia); while the daily Padomju Jaunatne (Soviet Youth) was the newspaper of the Latvian Young Communist League.

In the Latvian SSR, the LKP also published a monthly political journal Padomju Latvijas Komunists (Communist of Soviet Latvia, ; in the 1940s and '50s: Padomju Latvijas Boļševiks), with a parallel edition in Russian (Kommunist Sovetskoi Latvii). The journal ceased publication in 1990.

First Secretaries of the Communist Party of Latvia

Second Secretaries of the Communist Party of Latvia

See also
Pēteris Stučka
Imants Sudmalis
Vilis Lācis
Eduards Berklavs
Tatjana Ždanoka
International Front of the Working People of Latvia

References

Organizations of the Revolutions of 1989
Latvia
Communist parties in the Soviet Union
Banned communist parties
Collaborators with the Soviet Union
Latvia
Communist parties in Latvia
Parties of one-party systems
Political parties established in 1904
Political parties disestablished in 1991
Defunct political parties in Latvia
Latvian Soviet Socialist Republic
Singing Revolution
1904 establishments in the Russian Empire
1991 disestablishments in the Soviet Union